Sam Flint (born Samuel A. Ethridge; October 19, 1882 – October 17, 1980) was an American actor.

Flint appeared in more than 230 films, often as a "judge, lawyer, military officer, senator, sheriff, chief of police, or doctor."

Flint was married to actress Ella Ethridge, whom he met after she watched him in a play in Galveston, Texas. Later they had an agreement: "Neither will accept a part with any company unless the contract includes the other."

Selected filmography 

 Sensation Hunters (1933) - Ship's Captain
 Devil's Mate (1933) - Prison Doctor (uncredited)
 Broken Dreams (1933) - Dr. Greenwood (uncredited)
 Ace of Aces (1933) - Army Doctor (uncredited)
 Mr. Skitch (1933) - General Matthews (uncredited)
 One Is Guilty (1934) - Coroner (uncredited)
 The Murder in the Museum (1934) - Councilman Blair Newgate
 Such Women Are Dangerous (1934) - Doane, Doorman (uncredited)
 Money Means Nothing (1934) - Police Sergeant (uncredited)
 The Old Fashioned Way (1934) - Kid's Father (uncredited)
 I Give My Love (1934) - Business Man (uncredited)
 The Girl from Missouri (1934) - Senator #2 (uncredited)
 Chained (1934) - Gun Repair Clerk (uncredited)
 Death on the Diamond (1934) - Baseball Commissioner (uncredited)
 Belle of the Nineties (1934) - Fire Chief (uncredited)
 Wake Up and Dream (1934) - Theatre Patron (uncredited)
 Student Tour (1934) - Captain (uncredited)
 Tomorrow's Youth (1934) - Jim Lawton - Mrs. Hall's Attorney
 Mrs. Wiggs of the Cabbage Patch (1934) - Railroad Agent Jenkins (uncredited)
 Evelyn Prentice (1934) - Dr. Lyons (uncredited)
 I'll Fix It (1934) - Minor Role (uncredited)
 Broadway Bill (1934) - Racetrack Official
 Fugitive Lady (1934) - Conductor (uncredited)
 The Best Man Wins (1935) - Doctor (uncredited)
 Helldorado (1935) - Hale (uncredited)
 The County Chairman (1935) - (uncredited)
 Wings in the Dark (1935) - Rockwell (uncredited)
 The Winning Ticket (1935) - Captain (uncredited)
 The Mystery Man (1935) - Jerome Roberts, Publisher
 The Whole Town's Talking (1935) - City Commissioner (uncredited)
 Car 99 (1935) - Bank President (scenes deleted)
 In Spite of Danger (1935) - Sanders (uncredited)
 It Happened in New York (1935) - Ship's Officer (uncredited)
 I'll Love You Always (1935) - First Business Man (uncredited)
 Reckless (1935) - Jo Mercer's Father (uncredited)
 Mister Dynamite (1935) - Mr. Hollaner (uncredited)
 Vagabond Lady (1935) - Ship's Captain (uncredited)
 The Awakening of Jim Burke (1935) - Lawyer (uncredited)
 People Will Talk (1935) - Mr. Quimby (uncredited)
 Chinatown Squad (1935) - Ship's Captain (uncredited)
 Pursuit (1935) - Dr. Byers, a Veterinarian (uncredited)
 The Crusades (1935) - Captain of Hospitalers (uncredited)
 Atlantic Adventure (1935) - Colonel Barnett (uncredited)
 Anna Karenina (1935) - Husband - Second Couple (uncredited)
 Diamond Jim (1935) - Man at Bar (uncredited)
 Metropolitan (1935) - Bank Director (uncredited)
 The New Frontier (1935) - Milt Dawson
 Grand Exit (1935) - Mr. French (uncredited)
 Lawless Range (1935) - Sam Middleton (uncredited)
 Another Face (1935) - Police Sergeant (uncredited)
 A Tale of Two Cities (1935) - Aristocrat (uncredited)
 My Marriage (1936) - Simpson (uncredited)
 A Face in the Fog (1936) - Harrison - Newspaper Editor
 The Lawless Nineties (1936) - Justice Department Official
 Red River Valley (1936) - George Baxter
 Big Brown Eyes (1936) - Martin (uncredited)
 Florida Special (1936) - Doctor (uncredited)
 Champagne Charlie (1936) - Board Member (uncredited)
 The Lonely Trail (1936) - Governor of Texas
 The Crime of Dr. Forbes (1936) - Faculty Doctor (uncredited)
 Winds of the Wasteland (1936) - Dr. William Forsythe
 Public Enemy's Wife (1936) - Doctor (uncredited)
 Charlie Chan at the Race Track (1936) - Ship's Captain (uncredited)
 Wives Never Know (1936) - Doctor (uncredited)
 Two Minutes to Play (1936) - Martin Granville Sr.
 Along Came Love (1936) - Dinner Party Guest (uncredited)
 The Accusing Finger (1936) - District Attorney Benton
 Red Lights Ahead (1936) - Franklin Q. Whitney
 The Devil Diamond (1937) - Board Member (uncredited)
 Man of the People (1937) - Hearing Leader (uncredited)
 Blake of Scotland Yard (1937) - Chief Insp. Henderson
 Breezing Home (1937) - Steward (uncredited)
 Sea Devils (1937) - Yacht Captain (uncredited)
 Dick Tracy (1937, Serial) - Meeting Chairman (uncredited)
 Midnight Court (1937) - Judge (uncredited)
 Her Husband Lies (1937) - Crapshooter (uncredited)
 23 1/2 Hours' Leave (1937) - Chief of Police (uncredited)
 Racketeers in Exile (1937) - Finance Man (uncredited)
 Jim Hanvey, Detective (1937) - Bit (uncredited)
 I Promise to Pay (1937) - Police Sergeant (uncredited)
 You Can't Buy Luck (1937) - Judge (uncredited)
 Criminals of the Air (1937) - Chafin (uncredited)
 It Could Happen to You (1937) - President of Faculty (uncredited)
 Topper (1937) - Board Member (uncredited)
 Saratoga (1937) - Racetrack Judge (uncredited)
 Windjammer (1937) - Marvin T. Bishop
 Sea Racketeers (1937) - Sam Collins (uncredited)
 Roaring Six Guns (1937) - George Ringold
 Smashing the Vice Trust (1937) - Martin Standish, Lawyer
 Merrily We Live (1938) - Mr. Fleming (uncredited)
 State Police (1938) - Deputy Joe Palmer
 Over the Wall (1938) - Judge (uncredited)
 The Last Stand (1938) - Calhourn
 Female Fugitive (1938) - Edward J. Howard
 The Fighting Devil Dogs (1938, Serial) - Colonel Grayson [Chs. 1–2, 7]
 Delinquent Parents (1938) - Hospital Doctor (uncredited)
 Crime Takes a Holiday (1938) - Governor's Advisor (uncredited)
 Forgotten Girls (1940) - Judge (uncredited)
 Saturday's Children (1940) - City Hospital Doctor (uncredited)
 I Take This Oath (1940) - Uncle Jim Kelly
 The Way of All Flesh (1940) - First Director (uncredited)
 Double Date (1941) - Doctor
 The Singing Hill (1941) - Rancher (uncredited)
 Under Fiesta Stars (1941) - Fry
 Flying Blind (1941) - Army Officer (uncredited)
 Tuxedo Junction (1941) - Judge Lewis
 Marry the Boss's Daughter (1941) - Vice-President (uncredited)
 Road to Happiness (1941) - Col. Gregory
 South of Santa Fe (1942) - Harold Prentiss
 Reap the Wild Wind (1942) - Surgeon (uncredited)
 Shepherd of the Ozarks (1942) - Mr. Clark (uncredited)
 Spy Smasher (1942, Serial) - Adm. Corby
 Hello, Annapolis (1942) - Adm. Jones (uncredited)
 The Old Homestead (1942) - Politician (uncredited)
 Wildcat (1942) - Banker Giles (uncredited)
 American Empire (1942) - Doctor (uncredited)
 The Traitor Within (1942) - Businessman (uncredited)
 Mountain Rhythm (1943) - Pierce
 Thundering Trails (1943) - Judge Morgan
 Dead Men Walk (1943) - Minister
 My Son, the Hero (1943) - Sam Duncan (uncredited)
 Chatterbox (1943) - Production Assistant (uncredited)
 Swing Your Partner (1943) - Teal
 Dixie (1943) - Southern Colonel (uncredited)
 The Stranger from Pecos (1943) - Ward - Banker
 Batman (1943, Serial) - Dr. G.H. Borden [Ch. 1] (uncredited)
 The Masked Marvel (1943, Serial) - Police Sergeant (uncredited)
 The Kansan (1943, Serial) - Walter McIntire (uncredited)
 Outlaws of Stampede Pass (1943) - Jeff Lewis - Blacksmith
 False Colors (1943) - Judge Stevens (uncredited)
 The Crime Doctor's Strangest Case (1943) - Addison Burns (uncredited)
 The Phantom (1943, Serial) - Phantom's Father (uncredited)
 Casanova in Burlesque (1944) - Audience Member (uncredited)
 Lady in the Death House (1944) - Gov. Harrison
 Cover Girl (1944) - Coudair's Butler (uncredited)
 The Monster Maker (1944) - Dr. Adams
 The Lady and the Monster (1944) - G. Phipps - Bank Manager (uncredited)
 Gambler's Choice (1944) - Family Court Judge (uncredited)
 The Story of Dr. Wassell (1944) - Dr. Holmes' Board Member (uncredited)
 The Contender (1944) - Maj. Palmer
 The Chinese Cat (1944) - Thomas P. Manning
 Boss of Boomtown (1944) - Blaine Cornwall
 Stars on Parade (1944) - Executive (uncredited)
 Take It Big (1944) - Rodeo Official (uncredited)
 Man from Frisco (1944) - Chief of Police (uncredited)
 Goodnight, Sweetheart (1944) - Mort (uncredited)
 Mr. Winkle Goes to War (1944) - Army Doctor at Induction Center (uncredited)
 Silver City Kid (1944) - Business Man
 Allergic to Love (1944) - Dick (uncredited)
 Wilson (1944) - Orator (uncredited)
 Marriage Is a Private Affair (1944) - Bit Role (uncredited)
 Goin' to Town (1944) - Dr. Crane
 Lights of Old Santa Fe (1944) - Sheriff
 The Missing Juror (1944) - Judge (uncredited)
 The Thin Man Goes Home (1944) - Hotel Clerk (uncredited)
 Song of the Range (1944) - John Winters
 Together Again (1944) - Minor Role (uncredited)
 She Gets Her Man (1945) - Dignified Man (uncredited)
 A Guy, a Gal and a Pal (1945) - Judge (uncredited)
 I'll Remember April (1945) - Board Member (uncredited)
 Crime, Inc. (1945) - Judge Poole (uncredited)
 Circumstantial Evidence (1945) - Prison Board Member (uncredited)
 Swing Out, Sister (1945) - Mr. Bradstreet
 I'll Tell the World (1945) - Stockholder (uncredited)
 Nob Hill (1945) - Politician (uncredited)
 The Man from Oklahoma (1945) - Mayor Witherspoon
 Incendiary Blonde (1945) - Patron at Nick's (uncredited)
 Ziegfeld Follies (1945) - Majordomo's Assistant ('This Heart of Mine') (uncredited)
 Along the Navajo Trail (1945) - Breck Alastair
 Song of the Prairie (1945) - 2nd Sheriff (uncredited)
 Shadow of Terror (1945) - Sheriff Dixon
 Johnny Angel (1945) - Barnes - Theatre Manager (uncredited)
 The Windjammer (1945) - Arkansas Banker
 Captain Tugboat Annie (1945) - Fire Chief
 Who's Guilty? (1945) - Horace Black
 Gilda (1946) - American Cartel Member (uncredited)
 Lost City of the Jungle (1946, Serial) - Chairman of the Peace Foundation (uncredited)
 Junior Prom (1946) - Mr. Forrest
 Somewhere in the Night (1946) - Bank Guard
 Night and Day (1946) - Professor (uncredited)
 My Pal Trigger (1946) - Sheriff
 Big Town (1946) - Newsman (uncredited)
 Singing on the Trail (1946) - Terrence Mallory
 The Crimson Ghost (1946, Serial) - Maxwell
 Nocturne (1946) - Mr. Barnes—Movie Theater Manager (uncredited)
 Criminal Court (1946) - Insp. Carson - 18th Precinct (uncredited)
 Sioux City Sue (1946) - Doctor (uncredited)
 Magnificent Doll (1946) - Waters (uncredited)
 Lone Star Moonlight (1946) - Jim Mahoney
 The Locket (1946) - District Attorney (uncredited)
 It's a Wonderful Life (1946) - Relieved Banker in Potter's Office (uncredited)
 California (1947) - Higgins (uncredited)
 Hit Parade of 1947 (1947) - Janitor (uncredited)
 Lost Honeymoon (1947) - Colonel Lawlor (uncredited)
 A Likely Story (1947) - Doctor (uncredited)
 Prairie Raiders (1947) - Meeker - Secretary of Interior (uncredited)
 Swing the Western Way (1947) - Senator Darrow
 Sport of Kings (1947) - Chief Steward (uncredited)
 Heaven Only Knows (1947) - Heavenly Deity (uncredited)
 The Wild Frontier (1947) - Steve Lawson - Insurance Agent
 The Black Widow(1947, Serial) - Prof. Henry Weston
 Cass Timberlane (1947) - Charles Sayward (uncredited)
 Albuquerque (1948) - Doctor (uncredited)
 Phantom Valley (1948) - Jim Durant (uncredited)
 Caged Fury (1948) - Doctor Branson (uncredited)
 Mr. Reckless (1948) - Oil Field Guard (uncredited)
 Old Los Angeles (1948) - Martin (uncredited)
 The Strawberry Roan (1948) - Doctor (uncredited)
 Four Faces West (1948) - Storekeeper
 A Southern Yankee (1948) - Confederate Officer (uncredited)
 The Golden Eye (1948) - Dr. Groves (uncredited)
 Isn't It Romantic? (1948) - Townsman (uncredited)
 Adventures of Frank and Jesse James (1948, Serial) - Paul Thatcher - Banker
 Smoky Mountain Melody (1948) - Brandon
 Command Decision (1948) - Congressman (uncredited)
 Knock on Any Door (1949) - Prison Warden (uncredited)
 The Green Promise (1949) - Dr. Pomeroy (uncredited)
 Home in San Antone (1949) - Dan Wallace
 The Gay Amigo (1949) - Ed Paulsen
 Ringside (1949) - Doctor
 Brimstone (1949) - Dr. Cane (uncredited)
 Alias the Champ (1949) - Ring Doctor (uncredited)
 The Baron of Arizona (1950) - Board Member - Department of Interior (uncredited)
 The Palomino (1950) - Veterinarian (uncredited)
 Rock Island Trail (1950) - Army Officer (uncredited)
 Timber Fury (1950) -  Henry Wilson
 Bright Leaf (1950) - Johnson (uncredited)
 Snow Dog (1950) - Sam, Twin Rivers Factor (uncredited)
 County Fair (1950) - Racetrack Steward (uncredited)
 The Admiral Was a Lady (1950) - Yacht Captain (uncredited)
 The Return of Jesse James (1950) - Jeweller (uncredited)
 The Fireball (1950) - Dr. Barton
 Cherokee Uprising (1950) - Judge Harrison
 Blues Busters (1950) - Doctor (uncredited)
 Kansas Raiders (1950) - Bank President (uncredited)
 The Blazing Sun (1950) - Banker (uncredited)
 Outlaws of Texas (1950) - Banker (uncredited)
 Frenchie (1950) - Rancher (uncredited)
 Sierra Passage (1950) - Jim (uncredited)
 Belle Le Grand (1951) - Broker (uncredited)
 Fort Savage Raiders (1951) - Col. Markham
 Man from Sonora (1951) - Fred Allison (uncredited)
 Francis Goes to the Races (1951) - Board Member (uncredited)
 Snake River Desperadoes (1951) - Jason Fox (uncredited)
 Father Takes the Air (1951) - Chief of Police (uncredited)
 Strangers on a Train (1951) - Train Passenger Requesting Light (uncredited)
 Stagecoach Driver (1951) - Bill Prescott (uncredited)
 A Millionaire for Christy (1951) - Mayor Flint (uncredited)
 Saturday's Hero (1951) - Alum (uncredited)
 Leave It to the Marines (1951) - Col. Flenge
 Sky High (1951) - Col. Baker
 Northwest Territory (1951) - Pop Kellogg
 The Hawk of Wild River (1952) - Sheriff Clark Mahoney (uncredited)
 Road Agent (1952) - George Drew
 Carbine Williams (1952) - Board Member (uncredited)
 Young Man with Ideas (1952) - Mr. Jones (uncredited)
 Red Planet Mars (1952) - Worried Man at Lincoln Memorial (uncredited)
 Sound Off (1952) - Army Doctor (uncredited)
 Francis Goes to West Point (1952) - Major Olsen (uncredited)
 Sea Tiger (1952) - Jim Klavier
 Yukon Gold (1952) - Boat Captain
 The Lusty Men (1952) - Doctor (uncredited)
 The Steel Trap (1952) - Bank Teller #6 (uncredited)
 Ruby Gentry (1952) - Neil Fallgren
 Count the Hours (1953) - Judge #2 (uncredited)
 Cow Country (1953) - Maitland
 Law and Order (1953) - Mayor Hurley (uncredited)
 The Vanquished (1953) - Connors (uncredited)
 Devil's Canyon (1953) - Marshall Hayes (uncredited)
 The Moonlighter (1953) - Mr. Mott - Bank President
 Walking My Baby Back Home (1953) - Critic (uncredited)
 Loophole (1954) - Sam - Bank Guard (uncredited)
 Racing Blood (1954) - Doc Nelson
 The Outlaw's Daughter (1954) - Doctor (uncredited)
 Unchained (1955) - Parole Board (uncredited)
 Abbott and Costello Meet the Keystone Kops (1955) - Railroad Conductor (uncredited)
 The Big Tip Off (1955) - Father Kearney
 Night Freight (1955) - Gordon
 The Brass Legend (1956) - Old Apache Bend Townsman
 The Night Runner (1957) - Elderly man
 Shoot-Out at Medicine Bend (1957) - Brother Nathaniel (uncredited)
 Snowfire (1957) - Molly's Doctor (uncredited)
 God Is My Partner (1957) - Jury Foreman (uncredited)
 My Man Godfrey (1957) - Mr. Pepper (uncredited)
 Gunman's Walk (1958) - Townsman (uncredited)
 The FBI Story (1959) - Doctor (uncredited)
 I'll Give My Life (1960) - Roy Calhoun
 Psycho (1960) - County Sheriff (uncredited)
 Snow White and the Three Stooges (1961) - Chamberlain (uncredited)
 Critic's Choice (1963) - Little League Rooter (uncredited)
 Sunday in New York (1963) - Second Train Conductor (uncredited)
 Soldier in the Rain (1963) - Old Man
 The New Phil Silvers Show (1964, Episode: "Keep Cool") - Charlie
 Gunsmoke (1965, Episode: "Death Watch") - Jake
 Once a Thief (1965) - Security Guard (uncredited)
 The Swinger (1966) - Elderly Man (uncredited)
 Head (1968) - Old Man (uncredited) (final film role)

References

External links

 

1882 births
1980 deaths
20th-century American male actors
American male film actors